Plainfield Community Consolidated School District 202 is a public school district located in Illinois.
There are four high schools, seven middle schools, seventeen elementary schools, one early learning center, and one alternative school in the district. 

The  district is zoned to serve the towns of: Plainfield, Joliet, Crest Hill, Lockport, Bolingbrook, and Romeoville, as well as various parts of unincorporated Will County and Kendall County.

High schools

Plainfield Central High School
Plainfield North High School
Plainfield South High School
Plainfield East High School

References

External links
 

School districts in Illinois
Bolingbrook, Illinois
Community Consolidated School District 202
Romeoville, Illinois
Education in Joliet, Illinois
Education in Kendall County, Illinois
School districts in Will County, Illinois
School districts established in 1959
1959 establishments in Illinois